Escuela de Nuestra Señora de La Salette, also known as La Salette, is a private educational institution located in Dagupan, Philippines.

History
The school was founded on March 26, 1989, by Dr. Lina Galvan-Tan and was named after the Virgin Mary of La Sallete in France. The school's name is the Spanish translation of School of Our Lady of La Salette. It started as a kindergarten school and expanded its course offerings by opening the grade school, high school, and the college level.

In November 2000, Escuela de Nuestra Señora de La Salette became a De La Salle Assistancy School through the Lasallian Schools Supervision Services Association, Inc. (LASSAI). In 2006, the school earned another Lasallian Accreditation and it is now known as a De La Salle Supervised School.

References
De La Salle Supervised Schools

External links
Escuela de Nuestra Señora de La Salette

Universities and colleges in Pangasinan
De La Salle Supervised Schools
Schools in Dagupan